This article lists the administrators of the French protectorate of Laos, and also encompass the Japanese occupation of Laos.

(Dates in italics indicate de facto continuation of office)

See also
History of Laos
French Protectorate of Laos
French colonial empire

External links
World Statesmen – Luang Phrabang (Laos)
World Statesmen – Laos

History of Laos
Laos
Laos history-related lists